The Sioux (pronounced "soo") are a Native American people.

Sioux may also refer to:

Places in the United States
 Sioux, Wisconsin, an unincorporated community
 Sioux County (disambiguation)
 Sioux Township (disambiguation)

Military
 USS Sioux, several ships in the United States Navy
 , a Royal Canadian Navy destroyer which served in the Second World War
 Bell H-13 Sioux, an American helicopter

Transportation
 Sioux (passenger train)
 Sioux (steamship)

Other uses
 Sioux language, spoken in the United States and Canada
 Siouxsie Sioux, English musician
 Sioux barley, a 6-row barley variety

See also
 Sioux City, Iowa
 Sault (disambiguation)
 Soo (disambiguation)
 Sue (disambiguation)
 Su (disambiguation)